Sigei is a surname of Kenyan origin that may refer to:

William Sigei (born 1969), Kenyan long-distance runner and two-time world champion in cross country
Robert Sigei Kipngetich (born 1982), Kenyan long-distance track runner

See also
Kipsigis (disambiguation)

Kenyan names